Soundpieces: Da Antidote! is the first full-length studio album by American hip hop trio Lootpack. It was released on June 29, 1999 via Stones Throw Records. Production was handled entirely by member Madlib. It features guest appearances from Medaphoar, Declaime, Godz Gift, Kazi, Oh No, Defari, Dilated Peoples and Tha Alkaholiks.

Critical reception
AllMusic's Steve Huey gave the album 4 and a half stars out of 5, writing: "Much of the album's success is due to fantastic production by Madlib, who takes his place as one of the West Coast's most imaginative trackmasters, underground or otherwise". "The rapping, by Madlib and Wildchild plus a guest roster of West Coast scenesters, is consistently high-quality", he said.

Del F. Cowie of Exclaim! gave the album a favorable review, commenting that "[while] there are minute traces of their inebriated associates found in their system, their willingness to experiment is the strength they build on to forge their own identity".

Meanwhile, Stephen Thompson of The A.V. Club called it "a bit of a letdown, primarily because the band's relentless emphasis on keeping it real and defeating wack MCs gets mighty damn dull over the course of 24 tracks". He felt that "Madlib's P-Funk-inspired cut-and-paste production is impressive, with tracks stopping and starting and bleeding into each other, but inventive production only gets you so far".

Track listing

Personnel
Otis "Madlib"/"Quasimoto" Jackson Jr. – vocals, producer
Jack "Wildchild" Brown – vocals
Romeo "DJ Romes" Jimenez – scratches
Michael "Evidence" Perretta – vocals (track 3)
Rakaa "Iriscience" Taylor – vocals (track 3)
Nick "M.E.D." Rodriguez – vocals (tracks: 7, 22, 23)
Michael "Oh No" Jackson – vocals (tracks: 7, 23)
Kevin "Kazi" Harper – vocals (tracks: 10, 23)
Duane "Defari" Johnson – vocals (track 15)
James "J-Ro" Robinson – vocals (track 15)
Rico "Tash" Smith – vocals (track 15)
Garrick "Godz Gift" Williams – vocals (tracks: 17, 23)
Dudley "Declaime" Perkins – vocals (tracks: 21, 23), cover
"KutMasta Kurt" Matlin – mixing
Chris "Peanut Butter Wolf" Manak – executive producer

References

External links

Madlib albums
1999 debut albums
Albums produced by Madlib
Wildchild (rapper) albums
Stones Throw Records albums